is a Japanese manga series written and illustrated by Mizuki Kawashita. It was serialized in Shueisha's Weekly Shōnen Jump from February 2002 to August 2005, with its chapters collected in 19 tankōbon volumes. The series was licensed in North America by Viz Media, which released fourteen volumes between July 2007 and October 2010.

It was adapted into an anime television series and original video animations (OVAs) produced by Madhouse and Nomad (OVA only). The anime series was broadcast on TV Asahi from April to July 2005. A manga sequel, subtitled East Side Story, ran in Jump GIGA from April to June 2017.

Story

Strawberry 100%
The story chronicles the school years of Junpei Manaka, a student, aspiring movie director, and his relationships with the girls that enter his life. In the beginning, he encounters a mysterious and beautiful girl on the roof of his middle school and only remembers that she had strawberry-pattern panties. She leaves before he can talk to her but he finds a notebook nearby, belonging to Aya Toujou (an ordinary-looking glasses-wearing girl who is a gifted writer). The two become friends with the common ambition of turning great stories into movies. Thinking that Tsukasa Nishino (the most popular girl in his school) might be the mystery girl, he asked her out while doing a pull-up at the chin-up bar and was surprised when she accepted. He later realizes Tsukasa is not the mystery girl but continues dating her anyway. He places into Izumizaka High, but learns that Aya has given up an offer to the prestigious Oumi Academy to attend Izumizaka with him and that she is the mystery girl.

At Izumizaka, Junpei encounters a feisty girl named Satsuki Kitaoji. The two become friends because of common interests, but Satsuki falls in love with him. Junpei tries to join the film club but learns it has been disbanded. He revives the club thanks to Aya, Satsuki, and his high school friends as members. Junpei also discovers that his childhood friend Yui Minamito is moving into his family's home, but she ends up attending Oumi Academy. The film club produces one film per year, each written by Aya and directed by Junpei, which is screened at the school festival. Satsuki stars in their first film, Tsukasa is the heroine of their second film, and Aya is the heroine of the third movie.

Over the course of his high school life, Junpei experiences many awkward sexual and romantic moments involving the four girls in his life. Even though he is seeing Tsukasa, he also has feelings for Aya and remains indecisive about whom he really loves. Aware of the situation, Tsukasa grows impatient and breaks up with him. During this time, Junpei and Aya's mutual feelings start to grow; when Junpei finds out that Tsukasa still thinks about him, he becomes indecisive again. Things got more complicated as the students enter their third year and face college education and career choices. Tsukasa plans to become a patissier in Paris and Aya decides to go to the same college Junpei has chosen. She even goes to the same cram school as him even though their friends disagree with her decision to give up better schools just to help Junpei make films. Aya eventually tells Junpei she also wishes to try for the university her parents recommended, much to Junpei's disappointment.

Matters come to a head when Junpei sees Aya with her brother and mistakes him for a new boyfriend. Having attended the same high school and made films together, he thought that Aya will always be with him and is unable to accept her supposed new relationship. When Tsukasa confesses that she wants to be Junpei's girlfriend again, he seeks comfort from her, but later denies that it was because of Aya. He later finds out the truth and that Aya has always been in love with him, but Junpei does not want to be unfair to Tsukasa and stays with her. Later, even at the risk of Tsukasa finding someone else, Junpei decides to break up with her. Junpei feels that he has not matured enough to be with Tsukasa and needs to continue developing as both a film-maker and as a person. After graduation, the friends part company, each of them chasing after their own goals and ambitions.

Four years later, Satsuki has become the owner of a relative's restaurant and the gang chooses her restaurant as the spot for their reunion. Aya attended the prestigious university her academic achievements warranted and has become a successful writer and a more assertive person, even winning the Naoki prize (the Japanese equivalent of the Pulitzer prize). Junpei has won an award and has been accepted into a film studio after years of personal development. He is able to congratulate Aya on her accomplishments without jealousy now and hopes to adapt her notebook novel into film. In the end, Junpei reunites with Tsukasa, who has returned after several years in Paris, and the two rekindle their relationship.

East Side Story
The story continues with the introduction of Nakama. An aspiring writer, Nakama works at a book store and has a fateful encounter with Aya. While climbing for a book, she crashes on top of him, revealing her signature strawberry underwear. They are mutually attracted, but it is hard for either of them to admit their feelings. Things get complicated when Satsuki finds out about Nakama and tells him Aya is probably drawn to him due to her past affections for Junpei. The two have the chance to meet up to catch a movie and chat; her heel breaks and he carries her to make things easier for her. While he is carrying Aya, her draft papers are blown away and have to be collected. Nakama manages to get most of them, and Aya leaves while Nakama continues to search for the missing papers. When they next meet, Nakama reveals to Aya her missing work and admits he has read them. Nakama professes his love for Aya even though he's aware that Aya is still fixed on Junpei. Nakama makes it clear that, though he's not upset about her, he wants to be liked for being who he is and not because he's a Junpei lookalike. Aya talks about quitting, as she's unable to find closure for her past, but Nakama encourages her to keep on working, and promises he'll work on his writing as well. The story ends with both of them working on their writing.

Characters
 

A teenage school student. Junpei is constantly getting strung up in numerous embarrassing but endearing romantic situations throughout middle and then high school. Although his thoughts on girls can get quite self-involved and one-sided on occasion, his gentleness and kindness is what attracts them to him. His indecisiveness about the girls he loves—Aya, Satsuki, and Tsukasa—and inability to decipher their feelings is the focal point of the story. His dream is to direct films. While not academically gifted, he has a talent with cinematography that gradually develops as the story progresses. Junpei also grows more responsible in relationships. He has been seeing other girls while Tsukasa was still his girlfriend, and later while Aya is about to give up better universities. By the end of the series Junpei remains with Tsukasa rather than Aya. He is more considerate about Aya after hearing himself hugging Aya unconsciously. After graduation, with the risk of Tsukasa finding someone else in Paris, Junpei worked hard alone in Japan until they reunite. These experiences help make him a more determined and confident person.

A shy, affectionate teenage student. Aya is the mystery girl with the ichigo pantsu (strawberry panties—underwear with strawberry patterns) that Junpei seeks at the beginning of the series. Aya starts as a nerdy top student who wears large glasses and unattractive hairstyle. She is secretly writing a fantasy novel on her math notebook but lacks the confidence to show it. Junpei discovers the novel and encourages her to become a writer by sharing his dream of becoming a filmmaker, which he is also afraid to tell anyone. Aya falls in love with Junpei, and wonders about the ending of her novel—whether the hero will choose the beautiful princess or the ordinary girl who shares his dream—which coincides with their love triangle. She starts wearing contact lenses and lets her hair down, surprising the boys with her beauty. Aya attends Izumizaka High with Junpei and writes scripts for his three films. She expresses her affection for him gently. Although Junpei is attracted to Aya, he seldom senses the depth of her feelings. According to the afterwords, the author thinks that, among the main characters, Aya shows the most growth.

The most popular student in Junpei's middle school. She becomes Junpei's girlfriend early on in the manga, only to break up with him soon after entering high school. Supportive, understanding, and optimistic, she does her best to encourage Junpei in everything he does, yet is also straightforward and flirtatious enough to let him know exactly what she wants. Of the four lead female characters, Tsukasa's personality changes the most: flighty and somewhat hot-tempered during her middle school days, she develops a far more mature attitude soon after entering Oumi Academy. Tsukasa has a passion for cooking and baking, and works part-time at a French pastry shop. Her dream to study pastry-making further in France after graduation from high school forces her and Junpei to break up again several months after getting back together, but the two reunite once more upon her return to Japan.

A student of Izumizaka High. Satsuki is very popular among the boys in the school, mainly with the sports clubs and teams. Of all the girls after Junpei, Satsuki is the most confident in her love—having been the first to confess to him—and is constantly seen in his company. Unlike the others, Satsuki is very aggressive, often physical, with her feelings. She is confident about her attractive figure, particularly her large bust size, and constantly tries to push herself onto Junpei. Despite her total devotion toward him, Satsuki's feelings are rarely returned. 

Once a neighbor and childhood friend of Junpei before moving away, Yui acts more like a sister than a friend, despite being only a year younger. She is not at all shy around Junpei. To her embarrassment, Yui strips naked in her sleep; occasionally she will wake up midway through and redress herself (and is thankful that she tends to stay in bed and rarely sleepwalks). Though considered one of the four main heroines in the series, Yui is never considered a love interest, nor does she ever show Junpei any affection outside of their sibling-type relationship. She does act at times like an overprotective big sister (especially when Satsuki gets unusually clingy), because Junpei was something of a crybaby in their childhood days.

Media

Manga

Written and illustrated by Mizuki Kawashita, Strawberry 100% was serialized in Shueisha's shōnen manga magazine Weekly Shōnen Jump from February 19, 2002, to August 1, 2005. The 167 chapters were then compiled into nineteen tankōbon volumes by Shueisha, released from August 2, 2002, to December 2, 2005.

Strawberry 100% was later licensed for English language release by Viz Media. The first volume was released on July 3, 2007. The 14th volume was the latest, and was released on October 5, 2010. Viz Media also partnered with fellow publishing house Tokyopop for release in Germany under the name 100% Strawberry.

A sequel, subtitled East Side Story, was serialized in Shueisha's Jump GIGA from April 28 to July 28, 2017. The story focuses on Aya Tojo as a popular light novelist and university student who attracts the affections of a high school boy named Namaka, who physically resembles Junpei Manaka.

Anime

Strawberry 100% was adapted into a 12 episode anime television series by Madhouse, written by Tatsuhiko Urahata, and directed by Osamu Sekita. It aired on TV Asahi. Each episode consisted of two short stories. The last pair of stories were not broadcast in the original run; later, this episode has become known as episode 10.5. The opening theme is "Shine of Voice" by Dream and the ending theme is "Ike Ike" by HINOI TEAM.

Original video animations
The original video animations (OVAs) of Strawberry 100% were all released at different times compared to the TV series. The first OVA was released in October 2004 before the TV series aired (and was made solely by Madhouse). Chronologically, the first OVA story is direct continuation of the TV series. The second OVA series (four episodes) are not a continuation of the TV series, but are rather separate episodes based on certain chapters from the Strawberry 100% manga.

The opening theme of all five Strawberry 100% OVAs was "Kimiiro 100%" (君色100％), sung by the voice actresses of the four lead characters, Mamiko Noto, Megumi Toyoguchi, Nana Mizuki, and Sanae Kobayashi. The ending theme is different in each episode.
 OVA-2004 - Peppermint (ペパーミント) by Miyuki Hashimoto
 OVA-2005. Episode 1 - Jink White (ジンク・ホワイト) by Mamiko Noto
 OVA-2005. Episode 2 - Daigyakuten Kiss (大逆転Kiss) by Megumi Toyoguchi
 OVA-2005. Episode 3 - Kokoro Capsule (ココロカプセル) by Nana Mizuki
 OVA-2005. Episode 4 - Platonic Scandal (プラトニック・スキャンダル) by Sanae Kobayashi

Video game
A PlayStation 2 video game was later released, titled . The game was published and developed by Takara Tomy, and released on February 10, 2005, in Japan. The game was re-released under the Tomy Best Collection on March 30, 2006.

Reception
Initially critics expressed concern that Strawberry 100% would be a traditional harem comedy. Carlo Santos of Anime News Network (ANN) complained that Volume 1 quickly descended into "typical boy's romance fodder." Response to the characters was more enthusiastic. Robert Harris of Mania.com praised Volume 1 for developing "several effective, organic characters and relationships, along with a believable story and setting." Praise for the characters continued with the release of subsequent volumes, and worries that Strawberry 100% would be a traditional harem comedy abated. In his review of Volume 6, A.E. Sparrow of IGN Comics remarked "Strawberry 100% is a harem manga of the highest caliber, and it has all the trappings of a good harem manga: Plenty of fan service, excellent artwork, and in those rarest of cases, a compelling storyline." Comic Book Bin's Leroy Douresseaux, discussing Volume 8, enjoyed the excellent characters, and commented: "Strawberry 100% is a high school comedy/drama for everyone who loves the drama of high school love."

Most critics have praised the artwork. Harris noted: "The visual style remains firmly rooted in reality." While crediting Strawberry 100% with "some of the finest artwork available," Sparrow warned that Strawberry 100% has a great deal of fan service, "which will either repulse people or draw them in, depending on their predilection toward that kind of thing."

Notes

References

External links
 Ichigo 100% at Shueisha 
 Ichigo 100% at Avex Entertainment 
 

2002 manga
2004 anime OVAs
2005 anime OVAs
2005 anime television series debuts
Harem anime and manga
Japanese high school television series
Madhouse (company)
Romantic comedy anime and manga
School life in anime and manga
Shueisha franchises
Shueisha manga
Shōnen manga
TV Asahi original programming
Tomy games
Viz Media manga